Just Add Magic is an American live-action family television series, loosely based on the book of the same name by Cindy Callaghan. It was produced by Amazon Studios. A pilot was produced in 2015 and the series commissioned for a full season the following year. Amazon renewed the series for a second season in June 2016 after it "set a record as the most successful Amazon Original Kids premiere weekend in terms of U.S. Prime Video streams and hours."

A followup series, Just Add Magic: Mystery City, was released on January 17, 2020.

Series overview

Mystery City

Episodes

Season 1 (2015–16)

Season 2 (2016–18)

Season 3 (2019)

Mystery City (2020)

References

Lists of American children's television series episodes